Yannick Lincoln (born 30 December 1982) is a Mauritian cyclist, who rides for Mauritian amateur team Moka Rangers SC. He has won numerous national titles, and has competed at the 2006, 2010, 2014 and 2022 Commonwealth Games.

Major results

Road

2003
 Indian Ocean Island Games
1st  Team time trial
2nd  Time trial
2nd  Road race
2005
 1st Overall Tour de Maurice
1st Prologue
 10th Time trial, African Road Championships
2006
 3rd Overall Tour de Maurice
 African Road Championships
8th Time trial
9th Road race
2007
 National Road Championships
1st  Time trial
3rd Road race
 1st Overall Tour de Maurice
 3rd  Team time trial, Indian Ocean Island Games
 6th Road race, All-Africa Games
2008
 3rd Overall Tour de Maurice
1st Stage 3
 African Road Championships
4th Time trial
10th Road race
2009
 National Road Championships
1st  Time trial
2nd Road race
 2nd Overall Tour de Maurice
 African Road Championships
4th Time trial
6th Road race
2010
 National Road Championships
1st  Time trial
3rd Road race
 2nd Overall Tour de Maurice
1st Stages 1 & 5
 10th Time trial, African Road Championships
2011
 Indian Ocean Island Games
1st  Time trial
1st  Team time trial
 1st  Time trial, National Road Championships
 1st Overall Tour de Maurice
1st Stages 1 & 5
 All-Africa Games
2nd  Team time trial
4th Time trial
6th Road race
2012
 1st  Time trial, National Road Championships
 1st Overall Tour de Maurice
 10th Time trial, African Road Championships
2013
 1st  Time trial, National Road Championships
 1st Overall Tour de Maurice
1st Stage 6
2014
 1st Overall Tour de Maurice
1st Stage 1 (TTT)
2015
 Indian Ocean Island Games
1st  Road race
2nd  Team time trial
2nd  Time trial
 1st  Time trial, National Road Championships
2017
 2nd Time trial, National Road Championships
 2nd Overall Tour de Maurice
1st Stages 1 & 5
2018
 National Road Championships
2nd Time trial
3rd Road race
2019
 Indian Ocean Island Games
1st  Team time trial
3rd  Time trial
2020
 National Road Championships
1st  Time trial
2nd Road race
 3rd Overall Tour de Maurice
2021
 National Road Championships
2nd Road race
2nd Time trial
2022
 4th Time trial, National Road Championships

Mountain bike

2013
 2nd  Cross-country, African Championships
2016
 1st  Cross-country marathon, African Championships
2017
 African Championships
2nd  Cross-country marathon
3rd  Cross-country
2019
 2nd  Cross-country marathon, African Games

References

External links
 

1982 births
Living people
Mauritian male cyclists
People from Plaines Wilhems District
Mauritian people of French descent
African Games medalists in cycling
Competitors at the 2015 African Games
Cyclists at the 2006 Commonwealth Games
Cyclists at the 2010 Commonwealth Games
Cyclists at the 2014 Commonwealth Games
Cyclists at the 2022 Commonwealth Games
Commonwealth Games competitors for Mauritius
African Games silver medalists for Mauritius
Competitors at the 2019 African Games